In geometry, the tridiminished rhombicosidodecahedron is one of the Johnson solids. It can be constructed as a rhombicosidodecahedron with three pentagonal cupolae removed.

Related Johnson solids are:
 : diminished rhombicosidodecahedron with one cupola removed,
 : parabidiminished rhombicosidodecahedron with two opposing cupolae removed, and
 : metabidiminished rhombicosidodecahedron with two non-opposing cupolae removed.

External links
 

Johnson solids